Jan Svensson (born 24 April 1956) is a Swedish former footballer who played as a midfielder and made 26 appearances for the Sweden national team.

Career
Svensson made his debut for Sweden on 5 September 1979 in a UEFA Euro 1980 qualifying match against France, which finished as a 1–3 loss. He went on to make 26 appearances, scoring 4 goals, before making his last appearance on 16 October 1985 in the 1–2 loss against Czechoslovakia.

Career statistics

International

International goals

References

External links
 
 
 

1956 births
Living people
People from Söderköping Municipality
Footballers from Östergötland County
Swedish footballers
Sweden international footballers
Swedish expatriate footballers
Swedish expatriate sportspeople in Germany
Expatriate footballers in Germany
Swedish expatriate sportspeople in Switzerland
Expatriate footballers in Switzerland
Association football midfielders
IK Sleipner players
IFK Norrköping players
Eintracht Frankfurt players
FC Wettingen players
Allsvenskan players
Bundesliga players
Swiss Super League players